Michael Walrath (born April 17, 1975) is a serial investor, advisor and founder of startup and expansion stage companies. He has expertise in auction marketplaces, consumer Internet and digital media, fundraising, corporate management, and mergers and acquisitions. Walrath served as CEO and Founder of Right Media, an online advertising exchange marketplace that was acquired by Yahoo for $850 million in 2007.

After Right Media, Walrath co-founded the WGI Group, an early stage venture capital firm that provides seed investments to Internet entrepreneurs. Walrath currently serves as Chairman of Moat, a search engine and resources guide for display ads; Chairman of Yext Inc., a location software company that synchronizes business listings across 50 sites and has been valued at $270 million; and Board of Directors Member of Inadco, Inc., a cost-per-lead advertising platform. Walrath was the recipient of the highly prestigious Ernst & Young Entrepreneur of the Year award in 2007.

Early life
Walrath grew up in Brookfield, Connecticut and graduated from Brookfield High School. His first job at age 14 was making coffee at a small-town market.
 
Walrath graduated from the University of Richmond in 1997, with a BA in English. Following college, he began promoting athletic shoes at various sporting events. An interest in fitness later led him to two jobs as a personal trainer and fitness program manager. In 1999, Walrath changed his career path and started selling online advertising at DoubleClick, despite his lack of tech experience. “The only qualification I had was some sales skills,” Walrath said.

Career
Walrath began at DoubleClick in 1999. However, DoubleClick laid off 20 percent of its staff in 2000, but Walrath stayed with the company and progressed to director of direct marketing, then to senior vice president of strategy and development of MaxWorldwide. In 2001, he created DoubleClick Direct, the company's direct marketing offer.

In January 2003, he launched Right Media, a digital advertising exchange marketplace. Right Media allows web publishers to join advertising networks that display ads from the highest bidding network per impression in their ad space in real bidding time. Right Media showed a 2,539% growth in three years, from $1.3 million in revenue in 2003 to $34.8 million in 2006. Inc. magazine ranked Right Media as 43rd on the list of fastest-growing private companies in the United States. In 2007, Walrath sold Right Media to Yahoo for $850 million and became Senior Vice President of advertising strategy at Yahoo until 2009.

Walrath left Yahoo in 2009. He co-founded early-stage investment firm, WGI Group, with brothers Noah and Jonah Goodhart, who were founding investors in Right Media. One of the biggest investments was Yext, where Walrath serves as board chair. Walrath also co-founded and is chairman of moat.com, which counts some 15,000 clients, including AOL and Forbes.

In 2008, Walrath co-founded production company, Atlas Films, along with his wife, Michelle Walrath, and Stephanie Soechtig. Atlas Films focuses on feature-length documentary films that educate about social issues and inspire change. Their first film, Tapped, was an exposé on the bottled water industry and its effect on health, pollution and climate change. For their upcoming documentary, The Big Picture, Atlas, in partnership with Katie Couric, exposes the root causes of childhood obesity. The film is still in production.

In 2012, Walrath acquired the Surf Lodge, a very popular establishment for concerts and nightlife in Montauk, New York. He is also part owner of Swallow East, a family oriented, dockside restaurant in Montauk, New York. Swallow East opened their doors in June, 2012.

Philanthropy
He and his wife established in 2008 "The Walrath Family Foundation" to help further social, environmental and health organizations. In addition, the Walraths have donated between $10,000 and $20,000 to schools with which they've been associated. They have also supported environmental organizations such as Grassroots Environmental Education, Food and Water Watch and the Peconic Land Trust. The Walraths also support the arts and humanitarian organizations that fight genocide.

References

1975 births
Living people
American financiers
Brookfield, Connecticut
People from Brookfield, Connecticut
American exercise instructors
Philanthropists from New York (state)
American restaurateurs
American company founders
American chief executives in the media industry
American advertising executives
Businesspeople from New York City
University of Richmond alumni